Events from the year 1843 in the United Kingdom.

Incumbents
 Monarch – Victoria
 Prime Minister – Robert Peel (Conservative)
 Foreign Secretary – George Hamilton-Gordon, 4th Earl of Aberdeen 
 Parliament – 14th

Events
 January – Quaker magazine The Friend begins publication.
 6 January – Antarctic explorer James Clark Ross discovers Snow Hill Island.
 20 January – Daniel M'Naghten shoots and kills the Prime Minister's private secretary, Edward Drummond, in Whitehall.
 4 March – M'Naghten is found not guilty of murder "by reason of insanity", giving rise to the M'Naghten Rules on criminal responsibility, and subsequently committed to Bethlem Hospital.
 24 March – Battle of Hyderabad: The Bombay Army led by Major General Sir Charles Napier defeats the Talpur Mirs, securing Sindh province for the British Raj.
 25 March – Marc Isambard Brunel's Thames Tunnel, the first tunnel under the River Thames, is opened to pedestrians.
 27 March – decision in Foss v Harbottle, a leading precedent in English corporate law, declares that in any action in which a wrong is alleged to have been done to a company, the proper claimant is the company itself and not individual shareholders.
 4 April – William Wordsworth accepts the office of Poet Laureate of the United Kingdom following the death of Robert Southey on 21 March.
 April – Protestant Martyrs' Memorial erected in Oxford.
 4 May – Natal proclaimed British colony.
 18 May – the Disruption of the Church of Scotland takes place in Edinburgh.
 ? May – Blackgang Chine on the Isle of Wight opens as an amusement park.
 19 July – Isambard Kingdom Brunel's  is launched from Bristol.
 September – Ada Lovelace translates and expands Menabrea's notes on Charles Babbage's analytical engine, including an algorithm for calculating a sequence of Bernoulli numbers, regarded as the world's first computer program.
 5 August – Sarah Dazley, the last woman to be executed in public in England, is hanged for murder outside Bedford Prison
 22 August –  Theatres Act ends the virtual monopoly on theatrical performances held by the patent theatres, encouraging the development of popular entertainment.
 2 September – The Economist newspaper first published (preliminary issue dated August).
 1 October – News of the World newspaper first published. It will survive until 2011.
 3–4 November – the statue of Nelson is placed atop Nelson's Column in Trafalgar Square, London.
 13 December – Basutoland becomes a British protectorate.
 December – the world's first Christmas cards, commissioned by Sir Henry Cole in London from the artist John Callcott Horsley, are sent.
 Undated
 The Albert helmet, devised in 1842 by the Prince Consort, is adopted by the Household Cavalry.
 Liverpool Victoria Friendly Society founded as a burial society.
 Marlborough College founded in Wiltshire for the education of the sons of Church of England clergy.
 Alfred Bird produces baking powder for the first time, in Birmingham.

Publications
 Charles Dickens's novel Martin Chuzzlewit (begins serialisation January) and novella A Christmas Carol (17 December).
 John Stuart Mill's book A System of Logic.
 John Ruskin's book Modern Painters, vol. 1.
 Robert Smith Surtees' comic novel Handley Cross.

Births
 25 April – Princess Alice, member of the royal family (died 1878)
 30 June – Ernest Satow, diplomat and scholar (died 1929)
 5 July – Mandell Creighton, historian and Bishop of London (died 1901)
 4 September – Jabez Balfour, businessman, politician and fraudster (died 1916)

Deaths
 9 January – William Hedley, inventor and locomotive engineer (born 1779)
 20 February – Mary Hays, writer and feminist (born 1759)
 21 March – Robert Southey, poet (born 1774)
 25 March – Robert Murray M'Cheyne, clergyman (born 1813)
 21 April – Prince Augustus Frederick, Duke of Sussex (born 1773)
 1 June – William Abbot, actor (born 1798)
 25 July – Charles Macintosh, Scottish chemist (born 1766)
 16 August – Henry Acton, Unitarian minister (born 1797)
 18 December – Thomas Graham, Lord Lynedoch, Governor-General of India (born 1748)

See also
 1843 in Scotland

References

 
Years of the 19th century in the United Kingdom